A microkeratome is a precision surgical instrument with an oscillating blade designed for creating the corneal flap in LASIK or ALK surgery. The normal human cornea varies from around 500 to 600 micrometres in thickness; and in the LASIK procedure, the microkeratome creates an 83 to 200 micrometre thick flap.
This piece of equipment is used all around the world to cut the cornea flap.
The microkeratome is also used in Descemet's stripping automated endothelial keratoplasty (DSAEK), where it is used to slice a thin layer from the back of the donor cornea, which is then transplanted into the posterior cornea of the recipient. It was invented by Jose Barraquer and Cesar Carlos Carriazo in the 1950s in Colombia.

See also
Instruments used in general surgery

References

Ophthalmology
Surgical instruments